The 1942 Detroit Titans football team represented the University of Detroit as an independent during the 1942 college football season. Detroit outscored its opponents by a combined total of 82 to 66 and finished with a 5–4 record in its 18th and final year under head coach and College Football Hall of Fame inductee, Gus Dorais.

In addition to head coach Gus Dorais, the team's coaching staff included Lloyd Brazil (backfield coach), Bud Boeringer (line coach), Edmund J. Barbour (freshman coach), and Michael H. "Dad" Butler (trainer). Quarterback Donald Hughes and end Joseph Gensheimer were the team's co-captains.

Schedule

References

External links
 1942 University of Detroit football programs

Detroit
Detroit Titans football seasons
Detroit Titans football
Detroit Titans football